The Federal Highway Administration (FHWA) is a division of the United States Department of Transportation that specializes in highway transportation.  The agency's major activities are grouped into two programs, the Federal-aid Highway Program and the Federal Lands Highway Program. Its role had previously been performed by the Office of Road Inquiry, Office of Public Roads and the Bureau of Public Roads.

History

Background

The FHWA was preceded by several government departments and private organizations that oversaw the development of roads in the United States.

The Office of Road Inquiry (ORI) was founded in 1893. In 1905, that organization's name was changed to the Office of Public Roads (OPR) which became a division of the United States Department of Agriculture.  The name was changed again to the Bureau of Public Roads in 1915 and to the Public Roads Administration (PRA) in 1939. It was then shifted to the Federal Works Agency which was abolished in 1949 when its name reverted to Bureau of Public Roads under the Department of Commerce.

With the coming of the bicycle in the 1890s, interest grew regarding the improvement of streets and roads in America. The traditional method of putting the burden on maintaining roads on local landowners was increasingly inadequate. New York State took the lead in 1898, and by 1916 the old system had been discarded everywhere. Demands grew for local and state government to take charge. With the coming of the automobile after 1910, urgent efforts were made to upgrade and modernize dirt roads designed for horse-drawn wagon traffic. The American Association for Highway Improvement was organized in 1910.   Funding came from automobile registration, and taxes on motor fuels, as well as state aid. In 1916, federal-aid was first made available to improve post-roads, and promote general commerce. Congress appropriated $75 million over a five-year period, with the Secretary of Agriculture in charge through the Bureau of Public Roads, in cooperation with the state highway departments. There were 2.4 million miles of rural dirt rural roads in 1914; 100,000 miles had been improved with grading and gravel, and 3000 miles were given high quality surfacing. The rapidly increasing speed of automobiles, and especially trucks, made maintenance and repair high-priority item. Concrete was first used in 1893, and expanded until it became the dominant surfacing material in the 1930s.

Federal aid began in 1917. From 1917 through 1941, 261,000 miles of highways were built with federal aid, and cost $5.31 billion. Federal funds totaled $3.17 billion, and state-local funds were $2.14 billion.

Creation
The FHWA was created on October 15, 1966.

In 1967, the functions of the Bureau of Public Roads were transferred to the new organization.

It was one of three original bureaus along with the Bureau of Motor Carrier Safety and the National Highway Safety Bureau (now known as National Highway Traffic Safety Administration).

Functions
The FHWA's role in the Federal-aid Highway Program is to oversee federal funds used for constructing and maintaining the National Highway System (primarily Interstate Highways, U.S. Highways and most state highways). This funding mostly comes from the federal gasoline tax and mostly goes to state departments of transportation. The FHWA oversees projects using these funds to ensure that federal requirements for project eligibility, contract administration and construction standards are adhered to.

Under the Federal Lands Highway Program (sometimes called "direct fed"), the FHWA provides highway design and construction services for various federal land-management agencies, such as the Forest Service and the National Park Service.

In addition to these programs, the FHWA performs and sponsors research in the areas of roadway safety, congestion, highway materials and construction methods, and provides funding to local technical assistance program centers to disseminate research results to local highway agencies.

The FHWA also publishes the Manual on Uniform Traffic Control Devices (MUTCD), which is used by most highway agencies in the United States. The MUTCD specifies such things as the size, color and height of traffic signs, traffic signals and road surface markings.

Programs

Long-Term Pavement Performance Program 

Long-Term Pavement Performance (LTPP) is a program supported by the FHWA to collect and analyse road data. The LTPP program was initiated by the Transportation Research Board (TRB) of the National Research Council (NRC) in the early 1980s. The FHWA with the cooperation of the American Association of State Highway and Transportation Officials (AASHTO) sponsored the program. As a result of this program, the FHWA has collected a huge database of road performance. The FHWA and the ASCE hold an annual contest known as LTPP International Data Analysis Contest, which is based on challenging researchers to answer a question based on the LTPP data.

Every day counts initiative 
The Every day counts initiative (EDC) of the FHWA planned in 2009 and started in 2011 is designed as the United States road infrastructure project of the 2010s decade to identify and deploy innovation aimed at reducing project build delivery time, enhancing safety and protecting the environment. It also made a positive impact in accelerating the deployment of innovations.

Five steps were scheduled from 2012 to 2020 and include various technologies and methods to improve travel time, safety, project and contract management, saving energy, risks, cost and environment resources.

It started with reducing fuel consumption and improving travel time reliability by Adaptive traffic control, continued with implementing alternative intersections design and several money savings and anti-corruption strategies like independent reviewing of construction plans before construction is paid, also time saving strategies like right-of-way, on site bridge constructions as rapid bridge replacement.

Organization
The Federal Highway Administration is overseen by an administrator appointed by the President of the United States by and with the consent of the United States Senate. The administrator works under the direction of the Secretary of Transportation and Deputy Secretary of Transportation. The internal organization of the FHWA is as follows:
Administrator
Executive Director
Office of Infrastructure
Office of Research, Development, and Technology
Public Roads magazine
Office of Planning, Environment, and Realty
Office of Policy and Government Affairs
Office of the Chief Financial Officer
Office of Administration
Office of Operations
Office of Safety
Office of Federal Lands Highway
Office of Chief Counsel
Office of Civil Rights
Office of Public Affairs

Administrators

Deputy administrators 
 D. Grant Mickle October 27, 1961 – January 20, 1964
 Lowell K. Bridwell (acting) January 20, 1964 – March 23, 1967 
 Ralph Bartelsmeyer August 10, 1970 – January 25, 1974
 Joseph R. Coupal Jr September 30, 1974 – 1977
 Karl S. Bowers June 5, 1977 – August 3, 1978
 John S. Hassell, Jr. August 31, 1978 – July 11, 1980
 Alinda Burke August 8, 1980 – ?
 Lester P. Lamm September 17, 1982 – 1986
 Robert E. Farris August 8, 1986 - June 8, 1988
 Eugene R. McCormick June 30, 1989 - ?
 Gloria J. Jeff December 19, 1997 – January 3, 1999
 Dr Walter Sutton Jr (acting) January 3, 1999 – May 3, 2000 May 3, 2000 – January 2001
 J. Richard Capka August 5, 2002 – May 31, 2006
 Kerry O'Hare November 10, 2008 – January 20, 2009
 Gregory G. Nadeau July 8, 2009 – July 30, 2014
 Brandye Hendrickson July 24, 2017 – October 9, 2019
 Mala Parker October 10, 2019 – January 20, 2021
 Stephanie Pollack January 27, 2021 – February 1, 2023
 Andrew Rogers February 27, 2023 – Current

Executive directors 
Lester P. Lamm, August 8, 1973 – ?
Thomas D. Everett, October 22, 2018 – June 30, 2022
Mayela Sosa (Acting), June 30, 2022 - October 20, 2022
Gloria M. Shepherd, October 20, 2022 - Current

See also

Federal Motor Carrier Safety Administration
Highway Gothic
Intelligent Transportation Systems Institute
Intelligent Transportation Systems
National Transportation Communications for Intelligent Transportation System Protocol (NTCIP)
Title 23 of the Code of Federal Regulations
U.S. Department of Transportation

Notes

References

External links

 
 Federal Highway Administration in the Federal Register
 Payment to the Highway Trust Fund account on USAspending.gov
 Highway Infrastructure Programs account on USAspending.gov
 Records of the Federal Highway Administration (Record Group 406) in the National Archives

 
United States Department of Transportation agencies
Government agencies established in 1967